The Ministry of the Popular Power for Interior, Justice and Peace (Ministerio del Poder Popular para Relaciones Interiores, Justicia y Paz) is one of 39 agencies that make up the executive office of the Venezuelan government . This ministry is also called the Ministry of Popular Power for Interior Relations and Justice and Ministry of Interior and Justice.

The ministry is a dependent entity directly under the President of Venezuela.

History
Minister Jesse Chacon said in 2004 that the Ministry of Justice would then be called the Ministry of Interior and Security Policy. In 2013, President Nicolas Maduro announced that the ministry took the name of Ministry of Interior, Justice and Peace.

Ministers of Interior and Justice of Venezuela 

The current Minister of Interior and Justice of Venezuela Néstor Reverol.

Structure

Deputy Minister of Internal Security Policy and Law
Vice Minister of Prevention and Public Safety
Deputy Minister of the Integrated Police
Vice Minister of Integrated System of Criminal Investigation
Deputy Minister for Risk Management and Civil Protection

Organs and affiliated organizations
Autonomous Service Registries and Notaries
Bolivarian National Intelligence Service
Policía Nacional Bolivariana
Scientific, Penal and Criminal Investigation Service Corps
National Anti-Drug Office
National Identification, Migration and Immigration Administration
Grand Lifetime Mission Venezuela
Mission Identity
Venezuelan Observatory on Citizen Security
Services Corporation Surveillance and Security
National Institute for Land Transportation
National Commission of Casinos
National Directorate for Civil Protection and Firefighting

See also
Corruption in Venezuela
Crime in Venezuela
SEBIN

References

Government ministries of Venezuela
Internal affairs ministries
Justice ministries
Peace organizations